Air brick: A brick with perforations to allow the passage of air through a wall. Usually used to permit the ventilation of underfloor areas.
Bat: A cut brick. A quarter bat is one-quarter the length of a stretcher. A half-bat is one-half.
Bullnose: Rounded edges are useful for window sills, and capping on low and freestanding walls.
Cant: A header that is angled at less than 90 degrees.
Closer: A cut brick used to change the bond at quoins. Commonly a quarter bat.
Queens closer: A brick that has been cut over its length and is a stretcher long and a quarter-bat deep. Commonly used to bond one brick walls at right-angled quoins.
Kings closer: A brick that has been cut diagonally over its length to show a half-bat at one end and nothing at the other.
Coralent: A brick or block pattern that exhibits a unique interlocking pattern.
Corbel: A brick, block, or stone that oversails the main wall.
Cramp: Or frame cramp is a tie used to secure a window or door frame.
Creasing tile: A flat clay tile laid as a brick to form decorative features or waterproofing to the top of a garden wall.
Dog leg: A brick that is specially made to bond around internal acute angles. Typically 60 or 45 degrees.
Dog tooth: A course of headers where alternate bricks project from the face.
Fire wall: A wall specifically constructed to compartmentalise a building in order to prevent fire spread.
Header: A brick laid flat with its width exposed
Honeycomb wall: A wall, usually stretcher bond, in which the vertical joints are opened up to the size of a quarter bat to allow air to circulate. Commonly used in sleeper walls.
Indent: A hole left in a wall in order to accommodate an adjoining wall at a future date. These are often left to permit temporary access to the work area.
Movement joint: A straight joint formed in a wall to contain compressible material, in order to prevent cracking as the wall contracts or expands.
Noggin: Infill brick panels in timber framework buildings
Party wall: A wall shared by two properties or parties.
Pier: A free-standing section of masonry such as pillar or panel.
Plinth: A stretcher that is angled at less than 90 degrees.
Quoin: A corner in masonry.
Racking back: Stepping back the bond as the wall increases in height in order to allow the work to proceed at a future date.
Rowlock: A brick laid on the long narrow side with the short end of the brick exposed
Sailor: A brick laid vertically with the broad face of the brick exposed
Saw tooth: A course of headers laid at a 45-degree angle to the main face.
Shear wall: A wall designed to give way in the event of structural failure in order to preserve the integrity of the remaining building.
Shiner: A brick laid on the long narrow side with the broad face of the brick exposed
Sleeper wall: A low wall whose function is to provide support, typically to floor joists.
Slip: A thin cut of brick, sometimes referred to as a tile- used on internal spaces or in cladding systems.
Snapped header: A half-bat laid to appear as a header. Commonly used to build short-radii half-brick walls or decorative features.
Soldier: A brick laid vertically with its long narrow side exposed
Squint: A brick that is specially made to bond around external quoins of obtuse angles. Typically 60 or 45 degrees.
Stopped end: The end of a wall that does not abut any other component.
Stretcher: A brick laid flat with its long narrow side exposed
Toothing: The forming of a temporary stopped end in such a way as to allow the bond to continue at a later date as the work proceeds.
Tumbling in: Bonding a battered buttress or breast into a horizontal wall.
Voussoir: A supporting brick in an arch, usually shaped to ensure that the joints appear even.
Withe: The central wall dividing two shafts. Most commonly to divide flues within a chimney.

References

Bricks
Construction industry of the United Kingdom
Bricklaying British
United Kingdom-related lists
Wikipedia glossaries using unordered lists